Stavros may refer to:

Places

Greece
 Stavros, Chania, a village and beach in Crete, Greece
 Stavros, Grevena, a town and municipality in Western Macedonia, Greece
 Stavros, Ithaca, a village on the island of Ithaca, Greece
 Stavros, Karditsa, the seat of the former municipality Kampos, Karditsa, Greece
 Stavros, Larissa, a village in Enippeas, Greece
 Stavros, Thessaloniki, a village and a community of the Volvi municipality in Greece

Other places
 Stavros Reservation, a nature reserve located in Essex, Massachusetts

Other uses 
 Stavros (name)
 Stavros S Niarchos, a British tall ship
 Stavros, and Stavros II, pornographic movies by Mario Salieri

See also
 Stavro, a given name and surname